Sinasina is a term used to refer to for several Chimbu–Wahgi language varieties of Tabare Rural LLG (also called Sinasina), Simbu Province, Papua New Guinea. The term 'Sinasina' as a language name is an exonym. Speakers of the varieties of this region instead refer to their languages with tok ples vernacular languages endonyms, including: Dinga, Gunangi, Kebai, Kere, Kondo, Nimai, Tabare. The Kere community also has a deaf sign language, Sinasina Sign Language.

See also
Sinasina Sign Language

[Translation of New Testament.]   A translation of New Testament in the Tabare dialect the Sinasina language was completed and printed in 1975 by Charles Turner who at that time, was a member of New Tribes Mission. Charles also put together a Tabare dictionary which a copy of, I believe is in the library at the University of Port Moresby.  Also there were primers written to help the local people read and write their own language.  Rosalie Ranquist  and Nell Dreghorn were primarily responsible for these. I do believe copies of all these are still available.

References

External links 
 Recording of a word list in the Tabare dialect of Sinasina is archived with Kaipuleohone

Languages of Simbu Province
Chimbu–Wahgi languages